The Pan-Hellenic Women's Football Championship, also known as the Panelinio Protathlima or Women's Alpha Ethniki, is the highest professional women's football league in Greece.

The Pan-Hellenic Women's Football Championship was founded in 1987. Prior to 1990, the championship was organised by the regional football associations. In 1990, the Hellenic Football Federation created a committee on women's football which organized the championship. In 1990, the first organization was made by Hellenic Football Federation (EPO), which was named testing and the Hellenic Federation did not recognize him as a formal organization. The current winner of most professional Championship Greece is PAOK W.F with 17 domestic titles of the Panhellenic Football Women's Championship. [1] .

Format
The 2009–10 championship is organized into one group of 7 clubs and one group of 8 clubs. In the first phase of the championship, each club in the first group plays a total of 12 matches (home and away) against the other 6 clubs in the group over 14 rounds, while each club in the second group plays a total of 14 matches (home and away) against the other 7 clubs in the group over 14 rounds. In the second phase, the top three clubs from each group with participate in a new group competition with each club playing 10 matches (home and away) against the other 5 clubs. The clubs which did not finish in the top three of their group in the first phase will be relegated to the regional competition for the 2010–11 season.

From the 2010-11 season onwards, there will be no more different groups and stages. All 13 clubs will play a round robin league, so each team plays 24 matches. The champion will be the first-place finisher.

Current members

The following 19 clubs are competing in the A Division during the 2022–23 season.

Group 1 
 Aris
 Avantes Chalkida
 Elpides Karditsas
 Kastoria
 Larissa
 P.A.O.K.
 AS Trikala 2011
 Volos

Group 2 
 Doxa Pigadakia
 Ergotelis
 Leontikos
 Odysseas
 OFI
 Olympiada Imittou
 Rethymniakis Enosis
 Trianton Ialysos

List of champions
The list of champions:

References

External links
League at epo.gr
League at UEFA
League at women.soccerway.com
womensoccer.gr 

W
Top level women's association football leagues in Europe
1
Women's sports leagues in Greece
Football
Professional sports leagues in Greece